Bryansky (masculine), Bryanskaya (feminine), or Bryanskoye (neuter) is the name of several rural localities in Russia:
Bryansky, Astrakhan Oblast, a settlement in Seitovsky Selsoviet of Krasnoyarsky District of Astrakhan Oblast
Bryansky, Lipetsk Oblast, a settlement in Safonovsky Selsoviet of Dobrinsky District of Lipetsk Oblast
Bryansky, Novosibirsk Oblast, a settlement in Dovolensky District of Novosibirsk Oblast
Bryansky, Rostov Oblast, a khutor in Kamyshevskoye Rural Settlement of Zimovnikovsky District of Rostov Oblast
Bryansky, Volgograd Oblast, a khutor in Rossoshinsky Selsoviet of Uryupinsky District of Volgograd Oblast
Bryanskoye, a settlement under the administrative jurisdiction of Gusev Town of District Significance, Gusevsky District, Kaliningrad Oblast